RollerCoaster Tycoon is a series of construction and management simulation games about building and managing an amusement park. Each game in the series challenges players with open-ended amusement park management and development, and allowing players to construct and customize their own unique roller coasters and other thrill rides.

The first game was created by Scottish programmer Chris Sawyer, with assistance from various leading figures from the real-world roller coaster and theme park industry. The rest of the series contains three other main games, expansion packs, a number of ports, and a mobile installment. A refresh of the series, RollerCoaster Tycoon World, was released in November 2016, and followed up by RollerCoaster Tycoon Adventures for Nintendo Switch in 2018 and PC in 2019.

Licensing for the series is currently held by Atari Interactive, who renewed their deal with Chris Sawyer on October 11, 2022, for ten more years.

Main series

RollerCoaster Tycoon

RollerCoaster Tycoon was released for Microsoft Windows on 22 March 1999.  RollerCoaster Tycoon was later ported to the Xbox Video game console in 2003. The game was developed by Chris Sawyer and published by Hasbro Interactive under the MicroProse brand.

RollerCoaster Tycoon received two expansion packs: Added Attractions (released in North America as Corkscrew Follies) in 1999, and Loopy Landscapes in 2000. Two special editions were released: RollerCoaster Tycoon Gold/Totally RollerCoaster in 2002, which contained the original game, Corkscrew Follies, and Loopy Landscapes; and RollerCoaster Tycoon Deluxe in 2003, which contained the content in Gold plus more designs for the different customizable rides.

A port for the Xbox was released on 23 March 2003, handled by Frontier Developments and published by Infogrames Interactive. This version featured both expansion packs as well.

RollerCoaster Tycoon 2

RollerCoaster Tycoon 2 was released on  October 15, 2002.  The game was developed by Chris Sawyer and published by Infogrames Interactive.

RollerCoaster Tycoon 2 has two official expansion packs: Wacky Worlds and Time Twister, both released in 2003 and had no involvement from Chris Sawyer, instead being handled by Frontier Developments. The Combo Park Pack edition contains the original game and the Wacky Worlds expansion. The Triple Thrill Pack contains the original game and both expansions.

In April 2014, an open-source project, known as OpenRCT2, was launched to enhance the gameplay of RollerCoaster Tycoon 2, including fixing bugs and allowing the game to run natively on macOS, Linux and modern Windows. The game is completely re-written in the C++ programming language, but still relies on assets from the original game. OpenRCT2 reduces limitations in the original, and adds other completely new features such as multiplayer.

RollerCoaster Tycoon 3

RollerCoaster Tycoon 3 was released on  November 2, 2004, in North America. Although the core features of RollerCoaster Tycoon 3 are based on the previous games, Chris Sawyer, the developer of the first two games, acted only as a consultant. The game was developed by Frontier Developments instead, and published and advertised by Atari Interactive featuring a completely different structure.

Two expansion packs for RollerCoaster Tycoon 3 were released - Soaked! and Wild!. A bundle, RollerCoaster Tycoon 3 Gold, was also released, including the original game and the Soaked! expansion pack; this was followed by RollerCoaster Tycoon 3 Platinum (Deluxe for the EU version of the game), including both expansion packs and the original game.  RollerCoaster Tycoon 3 Platinum was released for Microsoft Windows and MacOS X.

A remastered version of the game titled RollerCoaster Tycoon 3 Complete Edition, developed and published by Frontier Foundry, was released for Windows, macOS, and Nintendo Switch, featuring widescreen support and revamped controls to accommodate for Switch features.

RollerCoaster Tycoon World

RollerCoaster Tycoon World was developed by Nvizzio Creations for Atari Interactive and RCTO Productions and released on 16 November 2016. The installment is different from previous games in that players build coasters with a spline-based system. It also introduced a new "Architect mode" and "safety-rating" options when building coasters. The game is also the first to incorporate the Steam Workshop.

The game received largely negative reviews, both from critics and fans of the franchise, particularly compared to Planet Coaster, which was released the day after and received largely positive reviews.

Spinoffs

RollerCoaster Tycoon 3D

RollerCoaster Tycoon 3D was released on  October 16, 2012. It was developed by n-Space for the Nintendo 3DS. While using many assets and engine content from Rollercoaster Tycoon 3, this game reverted to an isometric view and, due to the limitations of the Nintendo 3DS, removed features such as additional scenery and pools.

RollerCoaster Tycoon 4 Mobile

RollerCoaster Tycoon 4 Mobile was released on  April 10, 2014. The game was initially available for iPhone, iPad and iPod touch devices. The game was later released for Android devices (OS 4.0.3 and higher) on  October 18, 2014. The game was developed by On5 Games without Chris Sawyer's input (other than licensing). The game returns to the isometric view used in the first two games. The game is built on the freemium model with social media integration.

This installment was universally panned amongst fans and critics alike. It was criticized due to Chris Sawyer's absence in the making of the game and the heavy use of microtransactions and wait times.

RollerCoaster Tycoon 3: Mobile Edition
Released in August 2015, RollerCoaster Tycoon 3: Mobile Edition is an iOS version of RollerCoaster Tycoon 3 developed and published by Frontier and is a faithful port of the original game (tutorial mode, original 18 scenarios for career, and a sandbox).

RollerCoaster Tycoon Classic

On  December 22, 2016, a modified port of both RollerCoaster Tycoon and RollerCoaster Tycoon 2 was released for iOS and Android, featuring a single price point for the majority of content from both of the original games. It also features three in-app purchases for Expansion Pack content, based on the two expansion packs from RollerCoaster Tycoon 2 and an editor pack that allows users to create custom scenarios.

RollerCoaster Tycoon Touch
First released for iOS devices in December 2016, RollerCoaster Tycoon Touch is a free-to-play mobile port of RollerCoaster Tycoon World. Like RollerCoaster Tycoon 4, it contains in-app purchases and wait times, but expands upon the social media integration. An Android version was released in April 2017. In October 2017, items based on the Barbie brand were added to the game. On January 28, items based on Shaun the Sheep were added to the game.

RollerCoaster Tycoon Joyride
An on-rails shooter based on the RollerCoaster Tycoon franchise, named RollerCoaster Tycoon Joyride, was released in 2018. The game was poorly received.

RollerCoaster Tycoon Adventures
In January 2018, Atari Game Partners announced it was seeking equity crowdfunding via the StartEngine platform in order to develop a new game in the series. Titled RollerCoaster Tycoon Adventures, it is an adaption of RollerCoaster Tycoon Touch and was released for the Nintendo Switch in Europe on  November 29, 2018, and in North America on  December 13. The game was also released on Microsoft Windows via the Epic Games Store on  March 19, 2019.

RollerCoaster Tycoon Puzzle
RollerCoaster Tycoon Puzzle (originally known as RollerCoaster Tycoon Story) is a free-to-play entry in the series developed by Graphite Lab. Atari released the game in January 2020 for iOS and Android mobile devices.

The free-to-play title is based on the tile-matching genre, in which the tiles to match move each turn on rollercoaster tracks within each level. Completing levels helps the player to restore a run-down theme park as part of the game's narrative.

Gameplay

The player is given control over an amusement park and is tasked with reaching particular goals, such as improving the park's value, attracting more guests, or maintaining the park rating. Some scenarios in the game provide an empty plot of land and allow the player to build a park from scratch, while others provide a ready-built park which usually suffers from deterioration, bad planning, or underdevelopment. The player must wisely invest the limited amount of money provided.

Most scenarios require that the goals be achieved by a specific in-game date, or else the scenario is not 'complete'. Completion of scenarios is a prerequisite for unlocking further scenarios in the first RollerCoaster Tycoon game. In RollerCoaster Tycoon 2, all the scenarios are available for play and the player can complete them in any order they choose.

The player is responsible for building out the park such as modifying terrain, constructing footpaths, adding decorative elements, installing food/drink stalls and other facilities, and building rides and attractions. Many of the rides that can be built are roller coasters or variations on that, such as log flumes, water slides and go-kart tracks. The player can build these out with hills, drops, curves, and other 'special' track pieces (such as loops, corkscrews and helixes), limited only by cost and the geography of the park and other nearby attractions. There are also stationary rides, such as Ferris wheels, merry-go-rounds, and bumper cars, most of which only contain single ride 'piece' and are very limited in terms of variation. Rides are ranked on scales of excitement, intensity, and nausea, all which influence which park guests will ride those attractions and how they will behave afterward. The player can set the prices for park admission rides and guest amenities, although care must be taken so that guests will not think prices are too high. The player is also responsible for hiring park staff to maintain the rides, keep the park clean, enforce security, and entertain guests. Players may also invest in 'research', which unlocks new rides and improvements as time goes on, though it costs money to continue research. Research in a particular category is disabled when all attractions in that category are researched.

The guests, who are integral to the gameplay, are treated as separate entities which can each have particular characteristics and be tracked by the player around the park. The game keeps track of how much money they have, what they are carrying, their thoughts, and what their current needs are (thirst, hunger, etc.). Each guest also has some unique features such as their preferred ride intensity, and their nausea tolerance. Some scenarios are even biased towards a specific guest demographic and require the player to take this into account in designing the park. In RollerCoaster Tycoon 3, the player can create their own guest groups to visit their parks.

Sequels have continually upgraded the number of rides and amount of customization available to the player.

Legacy
Planet Coaster, which has been called a spiritual successor to RollerCoaster Tycoon 3, was developed and published by Frontier Developments for Microsoft Windows and was released worldwide on  November 17, 2016. Frontier Developments had previously worked in the amusement park construction and management genre with the Xbox port of RollerCoaster Tycoon, RollerCoaster Tycoon 3, Thrillville, Thrillville: Off the Rails, and Zoo Tycoon.

OpenRCT2 (2014) is an open-source version of RollerCoaster Tycoon 2 which adds some additional features and fixes numerous bugs.

Several user-created rollercoasters received media attention after footage of them were posted on various imageboards and social media.

The RollerCoaster Tycoon series spawned a popular Internet meme based on a series of posts made in 2012 on 4chan featuring a slow, ghost train track ride called "Mr. Bones' Wild Ride" that took four in-game years to complete, leading the passengers in the game to express "I want to get off Mr. Bones Wild Ride". At the ride's conclusion, the passengers were then greeted by a skeleton prop with a top hat, with a sign stating "The ride never ends". Both phrases have become popular memes.

Other media
The franchise has also spawned a board game and a pinball machine by Stern, both released in 2002, and a series of gamebooks released in 2002 and 2003. In 2010, it was reported that Sony Pictures Animation had acquired the rights to develop a film adaptation of the series.

References

External links

 
Amusement park simulation games
Business simulation games
Roller coaster games and simulations
Video game franchises
Video game franchises introduced in 1999
Video games set in amusement parks